Benzoylureas are chemical derivatives of N-benzoyl-N′-phenylurea (benzoylurea). They are best known for their use as insecticides. They act as insect growth regulators by inhibiting synthesis of chitin in the insect's body.

One of the more commonly used benzoylurea pesticides is diflubenzuron. Others include chlorfluazuron, flufenoxuron, hexaflumuron, and triflumuron. Lufenuron is the active compound in flea control medication for pet dogs and cats.

3-(Iodoacetamido)-benzoylurea (3-IAABU) is one of several benzoylurea compounds which have been investigated as potential anticancer agents.

Environmental toxicity

When applied in a dispersed way, for example through fumigation or spraying, these chemicals have an effect against a wide range of insect species, some of which may be beneficial to human activities, including crop-pollinators such as bees. In addition, as with many insecticides, application may result in the killing of natural predators or controls along with the pest, risking the possibility of a 'rebound effect' or pest resurgence, where the original target for the treatment returns with equal or even greater voracity.

Flufenoxuron was banned in the European Union in 2011 due to its high potential for bioaccumulation in the food chain and high risk to aquatic organisms. Flufenoxuron is marketed as having 'high persistence' in the environment and the product data-sheet states that it does not biodegrade easily.

References

Further reading
Lewis, W.H. and M.P.F. Elvin-Lewis. (2003). Medical Botany. Hoboken: Wiley. pg. 590

Insecticides
Ureas